M9, M-9 most often refers to:
 Beretta M9, a 9 mm pistol

M9, M-9 or M09 may refer to:

Aviation
 Grigorovich M-9, a Russian World War I-era biplane flying boat
 Miles M.9 Master, a 1939 British 2-seat monoplane advanced trainer 
 Motor Sich Airlines, a Ukrainian airline (IATA airline designator: M9)

Computers
 M9-IX, a short name for the Moscow Internet Exchange

Firearms and military equipment
 Beretta M9, the standard-issue service pistol for the US Army and other forces
 M9M1, a 9mm/.45ACP submachine gun
 M-9, the export name for the Chinese missile DF-15
 M9 half-track, a variant of the M2 Half Track
 M9 bayonet, a United States military knife
 M9 Armored Combat Earthmover, a United States military earthmover
 M9 Anti-tank Rocket Launcher, another name for the bazooka
 M9 flamethrower, flamethrower, United States
 M9 Gun Director, director used with 90mm anti-aircraft guns
 T40/M9 Tank Destroyer American tank destroyer

Science
 Messier 9 (M9), a globular cluster in the constellation Ophiuchus
 ATC code M09 Other drugs for disorders of the musculo-skeletal system, a subgroup of the Anatomical Therapeutic Chemical Classification System
 M9 medium, a salt medium for cultivating Escherichia coli

Transport
 M9 (New York City bus), a New York City Bus route in Manhattan
 M9, a Washington, D.C. Metrobus route
 Sri Lanka Railways M9, Sri Lanka Railways diesel-electric locomotive
 M9 (railcar), a Long Island Rail Road car
 M9 (Istanbul Metro), a rapid transit rail line in Istanbul, Turkey
 M9 road (Cape Town), a metropolitan road in Cape Town, South Africa
 M9 (East London), a Metropolitan Route in East London, South Africa
 M9 (Cape Town), a Metropolitan Route in Cape Town, South Africa
 M9 (Johannesburg), a Metropolitan Route in Johannesburg, South Africa
 M9 (Pretoria), a Metropolitan Route in Pretoria, South Africa
 M9 (Durban), a Metropolitan Route in Durban, South Africa
 M9 (Port Elizabeth), a Metropolitan Route in Port Elizabeth, South Africa
 M9 motorway (Ireland), a motorway-grade segment of the N9 road in Ireland
 M9 motorway (Pakistan) in Pakistan, also known as Super Highway
 M9 highway (Russia), another name for the Baltic Highway in Russia
 M9 motorway (Scotland), a motorway in Scotland
 Highway M09 (Ukraine)
 M-9 (Michigan highway), a former state highway route in Michigan, USA
 M9 Road (Zambia), a road in Zambia

Other
Leica M9, a camera
Meizu M9, a smartphone with Android
HTC One M9, a smartphone with Android
"M9", a song by British band Boards of Canada, released on their Boc Maxima demo in 1996
"M9", a fictional British secret intelligence agency in the television spy show Danger Man
 M9, a difficulty grade in mixed climbing